Funny Girl is the soundtrack album to the 1968 musical film of the same name, performed by its star Barbra Streisand. Released on the vinyl album format in stereo in 1968, the soundtrack was subsequently released in quadraphonic sound vinyl, cassette, and compact disc. The titles "Second Hand Rose" and "Exit Music" are omitted from the commercially released soundtrack editions. The soundtrack is featured in "Billboard Greatest albums of all time"., National Public Radio's "The Greatest Albums Made By Women"

Background and development 
Lyricist Bob Merrill and composer Jule Styne originally wrote the score for the 1964 stage musical of the same name, including "I'm the Greatest Star", "People", and "Don't Rain on My Parade". These songs are more melodically and formally complex than usual Tin Pan Alley songs that were popular during that time. "People" uses the verse chorus structure commonly found in earlier showtunes.

Track listing
All lyrics composed by Bob Merrill; all music by Jule Styne; except where indicated
"Overture" – [4:00] 
"I'm the Greatest Star" – [4:06] 
"If a Girl Isn't Pretty" – [2:26] 
"Roller Skate Rag" – [2:01] 
"I'd Rather Be Blue Over You (Than Be Happy With Somebody Else)" – [2:38] – (Billy Rose, Fred Fisher)
"His Love Makes Me Beautiful" – [5:39] 
"People" – [5:01] 
"You are Woman, I am Man" – [4:23] 
"Don't Rain on My Parade" – [2:45] 
"Sadie, Sadie" – [4:19] 
"The Swan" – [2:51] 
"Funny Girl" – [2:43] 
"My Man" – [2:12] – (Albert Willemetz, Jacques-Charles (Jacques Mardochée Charles), Channing Pollock, Maurice Yvain)
"Finale" – [2:20]

Charts

Weekly charts

Year-end charts

Certifications

Notes
A.  The Australian chart positions are from the Kent Music Report (KMR) / Australian Music Report (AMR) pre-1989 and from 1989 on from ARIA Charts.

References

Bibliography 

1968 soundtrack albums
Barbra Streisand soundtracks
Columbia Records soundtracks
Film soundtracks